Close To The Edge Provincial Park and Protected Area is a provincial park and a protected area in British Columbia, Canada.

History and conservation
The Park was established June 29, 2000 to protect Close To The Edge, a significant cave feature: the deepest shaft (255 m) and the third-deepest cave (472 m) in Canada. The cave was discovered in 1985, but its bottom was not reached until 2001. 

The adjacent Protected Area was established on January 25 2001 to protect the less significant caves Bluebell Resurgence Cave and Twin Falls Resurgence, and is a lower level of protection which allows future logging road access to the headwaters of Hedrick Creek.  

Both the Park and the Protected Area also protect habitat for caribou, moose, black and grizzly bears.

Geography
Close To The Edge Provincial Park and Protected Area is located within the Dezaiko Range of the Canadian Rocky Mountains approximately 160 kilometres northeast of Prince George, British Columbia. It is 702 hectares in size (414 ha Provincial Park and 288 ha Protected Area).

Facilities
There are no park facilities. Access is on logging roads, followed by unmaintained horse/foot trails.

See also
The Stone Corral (Monkman Provincial Park)

References

External links

Provincial parks of British Columbia
Northern Interior of British Columbia
Caves of Canada
2000 establishments in British Columbia
Protected areas established in 2000